Michael J. Needham (October 8, 1910 – February 1, 1986) was a Democratic member of the Pennsylvania House of Representatives.

References

Democratic Party members of the Pennsylvania House of Representatives
1910 births
1986 deaths
20th-century American politicians